St Helier railway station was a railway station in Saint Helier, the capital of Jersey in the Channel Islands. Opened in 1870 by the Jersey Railway, it was situated on the western side of the Weighbridge area, now Liberation Square. The station was referred to as "St. Helier (Weighbridge)" to distinguish it from another railway terminus opened by the Jersey Eastern Railway in 1873 in St Helier at Snow Hill. The station was in passenger operation until the line closed in 1936.

History
The Jersey Railway first opened in 1870, running services between Saint Helier and Saint Aubin with trains stopping at the three intermediate stations, First Tower, Millbrook and Beaumont. The first trial service ran on 28 September, and on the following day a train carrying 300 invited guests departed from Saint Helier. The line was formally opened to passengers on 17 October with a grand ceremonial opening followed by a banquet at Noirmont Manor, the residence of the contractor,  Mr E. Pickering. On the opening day, 4000 single journeys were made on the line.

The station was originally built with a single platform under a curved trainshed. in March 1884 this platform was replaced with an island platform with two lines and two additional outer lines, and in 1893 the trainshed was replaced.

The original station building was a single-storey structure which remained in use for 30 years until the Jersey Railways & Tramways Limited (JR&T) took over the line in 1896. A new two-storey station building was built by the Jersey architect Adolphus Curry and opened in 1901. It included a new booking office, refreshment rooms, company offices and a board room, and shop spaces on the ground floor. A large abattoir development was begun in 1888 adjacent to the station site.

During the summer months, the arrangement of the tracks at Saint Helier station was inadequate to cope with the frequency of trains and to speed up the turnaround of locomotives, a special "slewing table" was installed in 1902. This unusual mechanism was a moving track on wheels at the end of the line in front of the buffers. Station porters could move a locomotive sideways by disconnecting the section of track on which the locomotive was standing and slide it onto the adjacent headshunt track, allowing the engine to perform a turnaround.

Closure
In 1936 the Jersey Railway closed to passengers after a devastating fire at Saint Aubin's train shed destroyed most of the company's rolling stock. The company sold all of its land and stations to the States of Jersey for £25,000 in 1937. The platform at Saint Helier Weighbridge was removed and the train shed was turned into a bus depot for the Jersey Motor Transport Company to serve the Weighbridge Bus Station. The bus depot remained in operation on the site of the old station until it was demolished in the 1970s. The 1901 station building remained and was used as the Jersey tourist office until 2007. The station site and adjacent abattoir buildings were redeveloped and re-opened in 2010 as the Liberty Wharf shopping centre.

Occupation
During the Occupation of the Channel Islands by Nazi Germany in World War II, the German organisation Organisation Todt re-opened most of Jersey's defunct railway lines for military purposes, re-laying tracks to 1-metre gauge. The railways did not carry passengers, but were used to transport equipment and building materials as the occupying forces built fortifications using slave labour. Saint Helier Weighbridge station did not re-open, but the railway line was extended to the harbour, bypassing the station.

References

 
  (copy of 1998 Bulletin article text)
 

Transport in Jersey
History of Jersey
Railway stations opened in 1870
Railway stations closed in 1936
Disused railway stations in the Channel Islands
Buildings and structures in Saint Helier